CKVG-FM (C-106.5 Country) is an English language commercial radio station which broadcast a country music format on the frequency of 106.5 MHz/FM in Vegreville, Alberta, Canada. The station's owner, CAB-K Broadcasting Ltd. received approval to operate the new station from the Canadian Radio-television and Telecommunications Commission (CRTC) on February 20, 2014. The station will be licensed to broadcast at an effective radiated power of 13,000 watts (non-directional antenna with an effective height of antenna above average terrain of 107.8 metres). 

The station began testing on December 6, 2015.

References

External links
C-106.5 official site

Kvg-fm
Kvg-fm
Radio stations established in 2015
2015 establishments in Alberta